Abdulaziz bin Mutaib Al Rashid (1870–12 April 1906), better known as Ibn Rashid, was the Emir of Jabal Shammar from 1897 to 1906.

Biography
Abdulaziz bin Mutaib was born in 1870. He was the son of the third Rashidi emir, Mutaib bin Abdullah, and was adopted by his uncle Muhammed, the fifth emir who made Abdulaziz his heir. After Muhammed died of natural causes in 1897 Abdulaziz succeeded him unopposed. However, the Rashidi rule was insecure, as their Ottoman allies were unpopular and weakening. In 1902, Ibn Saud, the founder of Saudi Arabia, returned from Kuwait with a small force and retook Riyadh. Ibn Rashid died in the battle of Rawdat Muhanna against Ibn Saud in 1906 after several other battles with Saudis.

References

Further reading
Madawi Al Rasheed. (1991). Politics in an Arabian oasis. The Rashidi Tribal Dynasty. I.B. Tauris & Co Ltd, London & New York (based on a Ph.D. thesis presented to Cambridge University, 1988).

External links

19th-century monarchs in the Middle East
20th-century murdered monarchs
1870 births
1906 deaths
Arabs from the Ottoman Empire
Abdulaziz
Ibn Saud
Monarchs killed in action
Sons of monarchs